Anthology is the fourth compilation album by singer Stella Parton.

Track listing
The track listing is as follows:

I Wanna Hold You In My Dreams Tonight
I'm Not That Good At Goodbye
Danger Of A Stranger
Standard Lie Number One
Stormy Weather
Steady As The Rain
Room At The Top Of The Stairs
Young Love
Cross My Heart
I Don't Miss You Like I Used To
Lie To Linda
Something To Go Bye
Legs
Valley Of Desire
You're The Reason
Like Lovers Do
Picture In A Frame
You Said You Loved Me
Fragile
My Dreams Came True Overnight
Mandolin Rain
When The Fire Went Out
The Sun Don't Shine In Memphis
We Are Gypsies

References

1998 compilation albums
Stella Parton albums